T'uruqucha (Quechua t'uru mud, qucha lake, "mud lake", also spelled Torococha) is a lake in the Andes of  Peru. It is located in the Ancash Region, Pallasca Province, Conchucos District.

References 

Lakes of Peru
Lakes of Ancash Region